Abdullahi Dan Kanajeji, known as Abdullahi Burja, was the sixteenth ruler of Kano. Through forging of powerful alliances and the creation of trade routes, Burja shifted the identity of the Kano Sultanate towards trade and commerce, what Kano and its people are known for today. He was the first Hausa King to pay tribute to Bornu which secured an agreement to open trade routes from Gwanja to Bornu. He was also the first King to own camels in Hausaland. By the end of the 15th Century, Kano emerged as one of the most vibrant trading centers in the Sahel. Through trade, the Hausa language and culture was spread throughout the region.

Ascension and Reign 
Abdullahi Burja's mother's name was Tekidda. He was the third successive son of King Kanajeji to be made ruler of Kano. According to the Kano Chronicle, his reign coincided with the late days of the infamous Queen Amina of Zazzau. It was said that the Sultan waged war on Dutse and later took a daughter of their leader as his wife, the first mention of Dutse in recorded history. Burja established trade relations with Bornu and created trade routes from Gwanja to Bornu. This shift towards trade saw an intensification of slave raids by Kano towards the south to export to Bornu. Abdullahi Burja through his Galadima created twenty one new slave colonies. Slowly, trade in Kano shifted towards other commodities During this time, all the young men of Kano were enjoined to military service and only old men remained in Kano. Abdullahi was noted by the Kano Chronicle for his generosity.

Exploits of the Galadima 
Burja was implored to return home after his campaign in Dutse by the Galadima, Dauda, vowing to do whatever the King wishes. Galadima Dauda engaged in a slave raiding expedition in the regions south of Kano which produced a thousand slaves monthly for seven years before being asked to return home by the King. On his way back to Kano, the Galadima would build a new city every three miles with five hundred male and five hundred female slaves. When he reached Kano, he gave the Sultan three thousand slaves and informed him of his exploits. All in all, Galadima Dauda built twenty one new towns which he called "Ibdabu" and was made Lord of these towns by the Sultan.

Dagachi 
In the reign of his predecessor, his brother, Dauda Bakon Damisa, a great Bornu prince which the Girgam corroborates as Othman Kalnama sought refuge in Kano and took the title Dagachi. From that point, the figure is referred to as Dagachi so it is possible that this title was passed on to descendants of Othman. It is said that the Dagachi began to amass great wealth and power during Dauda's reign and this continued in the reign of Abdullahi Burja. When Abdullahi returned from his expedition in Dutse, he found that Dagachi had established a market in Karabka and built countless houses. Dagachi would eventually revolt unsuccessfully in the time of Abdullahi Dan Rumfa with his kin in Bornu coming to his aid.

Family and Marriages 
Abdullahi Burja was the first sarki to marry the daughters of the Galadima, Sarkin Rano, Sarkin Dutse, and Sarkin Shirra. He is the father of Sultan Yakubu, who was the father of Muhammad Rumfa.

Death and succession 
The death of Abdullahi Burja in 1452 saw a short period of instability that produced three Kings within eight days. His first successor, his son Dakauta, was dumb and the people theorized that becoming King would make him speak. He was turned out a day later when his speech wasn't restored. Dakauta's son then ascended the throne but abdicated 7 days later in fear of Galadima Dauda, allowing Abdullahi Burja's son Yakubu to assume the throne of Kano.

Biography in the Kano Chronicle
Below is a full biography of Abdullahi Burja from Palmer's 1908 English translation of the Kano Chronicle.

References 

Monarchs of Kano
1452 deaths
Year of birth unknown